Tritoqualine, also known as hypostamine, is an inhibitor of the enzyme histidine decarboxylase and therefore an atypical antihistamine, used for the treatment of urticaria and allergic rhinitis with no known adverse effects.

References 

3-(5,6,7,8-tetrahydro-(1,3)dioxolo(4,5-g)isoquinolin-5-yl)-3H-2-benzofuran-1-ones
Histidine decarboxylase inhibitors
Phthalides